Aspen Park is an unincorporated community and a census-designated place (CDP) located in Jefferson County, Colorado, United States. The CDP is a part of the Denver–Aurora–Lakewood, CO Metropolitan Statistical Area. The population of the Aspen Park CDP was 810 at the United States Census 2020. The Aspen Park Metropolitan District provides services. The Conifer post office (ZIP Code 80433) serves the area.

Geography
Aspen Park is located in southern Jefferson County. U.S. Route 285 passes through the community, leading northeast  to Englewood and southwest  to Fairplay. The community sits at the headwaters of South Turkey Creek, and the western edge of the CDP follows the course of North Turkey Creek. The two creeks are part of the South Platte River watershed.

Demographics

Education
Aspen Park is served by the Jefferson County Public Schools.

See also

Outline of Colorado
Index of Colorado-related articles
State of Colorado
Colorado cities and towns
Colorado census designated places
Colorado counties
Jefferson County, Colorado
List of statistical areas in Colorado
Front Range Urban Corridor
North Central Colorado Urban Area
Denver-Aurora-Boulder, CO Combined Statistical Area
Denver-Aurora-Broomfield, CO Metropolitan Statistical Area
Midway House (Aspen Park, Colorado)

References

External links

Aspen Park @ UncoverColorado.com
Aspen Park Metropolitan District
Jefferson County website
Jeffco Public Schools

Census-designated places in Jefferson County, Colorado
Census-designated places in Colorado
Denver metropolitan area